Inevitable Alien Nation is the second album by Keoki released in 1998.

Track listing
Coldcut feat. Jello Biafra - "Every Home A Prison"
Rainbow Bridge - "For Miles"
Dimension 23 - "I.M.O.K.R.U.O.K."
Rumpus - "Space Funk (The Caterpillar)"
Naked Funk - "Pleasing The Korean"
Kung Plao Chicken - "Rock the Peter Lao"
Minty - "Useless Man"
Spiritual Being - "Dansa"
Southside Reverb - "Go Get It On" (Original)
Junkie XL - "No Remorse"
Junkie XL - "X-Panding Limits"
DVUS - "Infectuation"
The Avenging Godfathers Of Disco - "Boogie Joint [King-size Mix]"
Beyond & Back - "You Only Live Twice"
Ed The Red - "Lady Electronica [Electronic Mix]"
Space Invaders - "-3:04.20"

References

1998 albums